Minnesota North College – Mesabi Range Virginia, most recently known as Mesabi Range College (MRC) Virginia campus, which was formerly known as Mesabi Range Community and Technical College) is a public community college campus located in Virginia, Minnesota. In 2022, the board of trustees of the Minnesota State Colleges and Universities merged the college with several others into a single institution called Minnesota North College.

History 
The college traced its roots to 1923 when Virginia Junior College came into existence.  When the new campus was built across from the lake on the corner of W. Chestnut and N 9th, in the current location, the name was changed to Mesabi State Junior College then to Mesabi Range Community and Technical College. Its name changed again, in January 2014, to Mesabi Range College. It is named for the Mesabi Range, an iron-ore deposit in Minnesota's Iron Range where the campus and Minnesota North College – Mesabi Range Eveleth are located.

In 2022, the Board of Trustees of the Minnesota State Colleges and Universities merged Hibbing Community College with Itasca Community College, Mesabi Range College, Rainy River Community College, and Vermilion Community College into a single institution called Minnesota North College.

Athletics
As part of Minnesota North College, a member of the Minnesota College Athletic Conference (MCAC) National Junior College Athletic Association (NJCAA), Norse Athletics include baseball, softball, football, men's basketball, women's basketball, and volleyball.

Notable alumni 
Myron Bright, United States federal appellate judge (A.A., 1939)
Douglas Johnson, Minnesota state legislator and educator
Stan Mikawos, a Canadian football player
Khiry Robinson, an American football player

References

External links
 

Community colleges in Minnesota
Educational institutions established in 1925
Two-year colleges in the United States
Universities and colleges in St. Louis County, Minnesota
Buildings and structures in Virginia, Minnesota
NJCAA athletics
Minnesota North College
Virginia, Minnesota
1925 establishments in Minnesota